New Hampshire Route 130 (abbreviated NH 130) is a  secondary east–west state highway in New Hampshire. The road runs between Brookline and Nashua, passing through the town of Hollis in the middle.

The western terminus of NH 130 is at the junction with New Hampshire Route 13 in Brookline as Milford Street.  The eastern terminus of NH 130 is in Nashua at New Hampshire Route 101A (Amherst Street), at which point NH 130 is named Broad Street.

Major intersections

References

External links

130
Transportation in Hillsborough County, New Hampshire